Martin Henriksen may refer to:

Martin Henriksen (Danish politician) (born 1980)
Martin Henriksen (Norwegian politician) (born 1979)

See also
Martin Henriksson (born 1974), Swedish musician